The Kaluzhsko-Rizhskaya line is a line of the Moscow Metro, that originally existed as two separate radial lines, Rizhskaya and Kaluzhskaya opened in 1958 and 1962, respectively. Only in 1971 were they united into a single line as the central section connecting the stations Oktyabrskaya to Prospekt Mira was completed. It was also the first line in Moscow to have a cross-platform transfer. The Rizhsky radius is roughly aligned with a northern avenue Prospekt Mira, while the Kaluzhskiy radius generally follows a southwestern street Profsoyuznaya Ulitsa. Presently, the Kaluzhsko-Rizhskaya line is the third busiest in the system with a passenger traffic rate of 1.015 million per day.

History 
The Kaluzhsko-Rizhskaya line was the first one in Moscow to be built in the time of the new epoch, when contrary to the old time-consuming manual work that produced the most famous stations in the system the De-Stalinization policies of Nikita Khrushchev forced the modernisation and development of new saving techniques.

Rizhsky
Nonetheless the overall layout of the Metro was completed in 1954 when the ring became fully operational.  Moscow Metro planners immediately drew new areas of development which would come in radii starting at the ring.  The first such radius became the Rizhsky, which would expand northwards from the Botanichesky Sad (now Prospekt Mira) station along the Mira avenue past the Rizhsky Rail Terminal and terminate at the newly built All-Russia Exhibition Centre.  Construction began in the mid 1950s and in 1958 the first four stations of the new radius opened.  Already the first stations show a clear transition away from the Stalinist elements in architecture, where it is obvious how the original project was altered to make it simpler and aesthetic. New construction methods, such as shortening the station vault diameters from 9.5 to 8.5 metres and new element junction methods dramatically reduced the building time.

Kaluzhsky
On the opposite end of the ring, a second new radius was planned to be built – Kaluzhsky, which would follow on a southeast contour to the first newly built Cheryomushki bedroom districts made from Khrushchyovka houses.  Like the cheap buildings it expanded into the Kaluzhsky radius was made completely of any decorative architecture whatsoever.  For the first time a joint project for a sub-surface station – the Sorkonozhka (Centipede) was created.  Consisting of an enclosed concrete prism, it featured two supporting rows of pillars for the ceiling.  The original design was standardised to the point where stations differed only in the colour of marble on the pillars and the ceramic tiling patterns of the walls.  However the method allowed for even further increase in construction methods.  A rational combination of using deep-level shield tunnels and a sub-surface station pit allowed for this, and would become the most widely used technique in many ex-USSR metro systems. In 1962 the Kaluzhskaya line was opened, and in 1964 it had its first extension to the new Kaluzhskoye depot where a temporary surface station was opened.

Transfer points
Originally it was thought that the two radii could exist on their own and terminate at the ring; however, the dynamic passenger inflow immediately made the Metro planners realise the mistake. To correct this, it was decided to link the radii to a diameter and relieve the ring by allowing several transfer points inside the circumference.  In 1970 the first extension northwards from Oktyabrskaya took place where the line met up with the Tagansko-Krasnopresnenskaya line at Kitay-gorod, for the first time, a combined cross-platform transfer was opened with both stations built simultaneously. Finally, at the end of 1971, the lines linked up with the central section forming the Kaluzhsko-Rizhskaya line.  The two stations that formed the final junction used a new method of mounting hydroisolation, which was made separately and then suspended instead of mounting it piece by piece.  This allowed a three-month work to be finished in little more than a week.

Extension projects
North
After the joining of the radii the line became a full transport artery. Several more extension projects were carried out. A northern one opened in 1978 and finally allowed the late Soviet decorative architecture to blossom. At four stations long, it extended past the Russian Botanical Gardens into the new northern districts of Babushkinsky and Medvedkovo. The extension also featured a new depot. Part of the track lies across Yauza River though passengers can not see it as the track bridge is a covered tunnel.

South
At the same time several projects on the southern radius took place. In 1974 the temporary depot station was closed and the line expanded into Belyayevo.  In 1980 Shabolovskaya was opened between Oktyabrskaya and Leninsky Prospekt stations. The original stretch was built under very difficult geological conditions, with pressure as much as 2.3 bars.  The planned deep-level station was abandoned due to difficulties in building an escalator tunnel. However, in 1980 the continued development in engineering techniques allowed for this to finish and the station was opened without any disruption to the service.

Southwest
In the late 1980s work began on the final section in the southwest, to the new suburbs of Konkovo and Yasenevo finally reaching the edge of the Bitsa Park in 1990.

Timeline

Transfers

Rolling stock
The line is served by two depots, Kaluzhskoe (№ 5) and Sviblovo (№ 10). Most of the trains are 81–717.5/714.5 models which were received new from 1987, however 12 of them are the new 81-717.5M/714.5M which were added to Sviblovo's park in 1996/1997. In 2017, the Moscow Metro began replacing the 81–717.5/714.5 and 81-717.5M/714.5M models with 81-760/761s (Oka). The 81-760/761s stopped being used on the line on 22 August 2018. In 2018, Moscow Mayor Sergey Sobyanin announced that the next-generation 81-765/766/767 (Moscow) trains would operate on the line from 2019, and within five to six years the old rolling stock would be entirely replaced. In May 2018, the first 81-765/766/767 train began operating on the line, ahead of schedule. In December 2020, the first 81-775/776/777 train began operating on the line.

Subway car types used on the line over the years:

 Series G: 1958 - 1982
 Series E, Ezh, Em-508 and Em-509: 1972 - 1996
 Series 81-717/714: 1987 - present
 Series 81-717.5/714.5: 1988 - present
 Series 81-717.5M/714.5M: 1993 - present
 Series 81-760/761: 2017 - 2018
 Series 81-760A/761A/763A: 2018
 Series 81-765/766/767: 2018 - present
 Series 81-765.3/766.3/767.3: 2018 - present
 Series 81-765.4/766.4/767.4: 2019 - 2020
 Series 81-775/776/777: 2020 - present

Recent developments and future plans
Currently the line spans through the entire city and no extensions are planned in the nearby future. However several projects exist. The first one was to connect the town of Mytishchi in the Moscow Oblast with the Moscow Metro, this was however declared unnecessary by the mayor of the city. Another one was to extend from Bitsevsky Park to Annino of the Serpukhovsko-Timiryazevskaya line, however it is unlikely this will be realized due to the preserved area of the Bitsa Park, and a newer project to bring the Butovskaya Light Metro line to the southern radius.

The lack of transfer to the Serpukhovsko-Timiryazevskaya line has led to a plan to build Yakimanka station between Oktyabrskaya and Tretyakovskaya, which will offer a transfer to Polyanka.

Several projects also exist to modernize the older stations. A second entrance was added to VDNKh in 1997 and Akademicheskaya has had a restoration of its ceramic tiled walls replacing them with aluminium planes. Recently it has emerged that the Moscow circular railway will be converted into a form of urban transport. If so then the conserved transfer from Leninsky Prospekt to the railway station Ploschad Gagarina will be opened.

References

External links

Station photos on the Robert Schwandl's UrbanRail site
Line gallery on the Urban Electric Transit

Moscow Metro lines
Railway lines opened in 1971